2021 Historic Grand Prix of Monaco was the twelfth running of the Historic Grand Prix of Monaco, a motor racing event for heritage Grand Prix, Voiturettes, Formula One, Formula Two and Sports cars.

The event was originally scheduled to take place in 2020 but was postponed due to the COVID-19 pandemic.

Summary

Series A
Series A featured Pre-war Grand Prix cars and Voiturettes.

Qualifying

Race

Series B
Series B featured pre-1961 Formula One and Formula Two cars.

Qualifying

Race

Series C
Series C featured front-engined sports racing cars built between 1952 and 1957

Qualifying

Race

Series D
Series D featured Formula One cars of 1500cc engine capacity built between 1961 and 1965.

Qualifying

Race

Series E
Series E featured Formula One cars of 3000cc engine capacity built between 1966 and 1972

Qualifying

Race

Series F
Series F featured Formula One cars of 3000cc engine capacity built between 1973 and 1976.

Qualifying

Race

 – Werner received a 25-second time penalty for causing a collision.

Series G
Series G featured Formula One cars of 3000cc engine capacity built between 1977 and 1980.

Qualifying

Race

References

External links
Official website

Historic Grand Prix of Monaco
Historic Grand Prix of Monaco
Monaco Grand Prix
Historic motorsport events